See also Prince Katsura, the second son of Prince Mikasa.

The  was the one of the four shinnōke, branches of the Imperial Family of Japan which were eligible to succeed to the Chrysanthemum Throne in the event that the main line should die out. It was founded by Prince Toshihito, a grandson of Emperor Ōgimachi and brother of Emperor Go-Yōzei. It is the second oldest of the shinnōke, after the Fushimi-no-miya.

The Katsura-no-miya house has died out several times, and has undergone a number of changes in name. It was originally titled Hachijō-no-miya. Prince Hachijō-no-miya Toshihito lived at the Katsura Imperial Villa in Kyoto, hence he and all of his lineage are referred to as Katsura-no-miya.

Prince Yoshihito of Mikasa, the second son of Prince Mikasa received the title Katsura-no-miya in 1988. However this title is connected to his , Katsura (Cercidiphyllum) and thus is not related to the  shinnōke title.

Unless otherwise stated, all Princes listed here are the sons of their predecessors.

See also
Katsura Imperial Villa

References
 Keane, Donald. Emperor Of Japan: Meiji And His World, 1852-1912. Columbia University Press (2005). 
Lebra, Sugiyama Takie. Above the Clouds: Status Culture of the Modern Japanese Nobility. University of California Press (1995). 

 
Japanese nobility